The 2017–18 Boston Celtics season was the 72nd season of the franchise in the National Basketball Association (NBA). The Celtics originally acquired the number one pick of the NBA draft due to a previous trade involving the Brooklyn Nets, only to then trade it to the Philadelphia 76ers in exchange for two different draft picks. One of the picks would allow Boston to draft forward Jayson Tatum. Later, they acquired Gordon Hayward in free agency on July 7, 2017. They would also acquire Kyrie Irving from the Cleveland Cavaliers via trade on August 22, 2017 in exchange for Ante Žižić, Jae Crowder, All-Star point guard Isaiah Thomas, the Brooklyn Nets' unprotected first round pick in the 2018 NBA draft, and a 2020 second round pick, originally from the Miami Heat. The Celtics played the first game of the regular season on October 17, 2017, against the Cleveland Cavaliers.

The team retired the number 34 in honor of former small forward Paul Pierce on February 11, 2018, following a game against the Cavaliers. 

In the playoffs, the Celtics defeated the 7th seeded Milwaukee Bucks in the First Round in seven games, advancing to the Semifinals, where they faced the Philadelphia 76ers, winning in five games, advancing to the Conference Finals, where they faced the Cleveland Cavaliers in a rematch of last season's Eastern Conference Finals, in which the Cavaliers won 4–3. Despite losing both star acquisitions Gordon Hayward and Kyrie Irving before the playoffs began to season-ending injuries, the Celtics would make this series more hard-fought this time (each game ending with no larger than a deficit of 8 points), but lost in seven games to the Cavaliers, losing 79–87 at home in Game 7. It marks the first time since the 1987–88 season that the Celtics made two consecutive Conference Finals.

Draft picks

Despite having the best record in the Eastern Conference the previous season, the Celtics would originally win the number one pick at the end of the year because they activated the right to swap their own first-round draft pick (which was pick number 27) with the Brooklyn Nets, who held the worst record of the entire NBA that same season. (The Nets struggled in part because of a previous, infamous trade with the Celtics, that swapped role players Jason Terry and D.J. White and superstars Kevin Garnett and Paul Pierce for other players and draft picks, including the right to swap first round picks in the 2017 NBA draft.) However, on June 19, four days before the 2017 NBA draft commenced, the Celtics would trade that coveted pick to the Philadelphia 76ers in exchange for the third pick of the draft (which was projected to be a small forward in either Josh Jackson or Jayson Tatum by that point) and either the Sacramento Kings or Philadelphia 76ers' 2019 first round pick, depending on what happens in that year's draft. Other than that, the Celtics also hold three second round draft picks, each of which were acquired by trades, while losing their own second round pick as an added piece of help for the Nets later on down the line. Their first second round pick was acquired from the Phoenix Suns back when it was considered a first round pick from the Minnesota Timberwolves in exchange for Brandan Wright. The next second round pick was had from the Cleveland Cavaliers alongside their 2016 second round pick and Keith Bogans in exchange for John Lucas III, Erik Murphy, Dwight Powell, Malcolm Thomas, and the protected rights of the Sacramento Kings' own second round picks from both 2015 and 2017. Finally, their last second round pick was acquired from the Los Angeles Clippers in a three-way trade with the Phoenix Suns, where Boston would acquire Shavlik Randolph again and a trade exception from the Suns, as well as both Chris Douglas-Roberts and a second round pick from the Clippers.

With their top pick (and the one that Danny Ainge claimed would have taken as the number one pick instead of Markelle Fultz), the Boston Celtics selected a 19-year-old freshman, small forward Jayson Tatum, of Duke University. In his only season at Duke, Jayson averaged 16.8 points, 7.3 rebounds, 2.1 assists, 1.3 steals, and 1.1 blocks per game in over 29 games there, while also earning All-ACC Freshman Team and All-ACC Third Team honors throughout last season. Tatum would end the season as a near-unanimous NBA All-Rookie First Team member. In terms of their second round picks, the first one they took would be another small forward, this time being Semi Ojeleye, a transfer junior from Southern Methodist University (previously from Duke University as well). During his only year at Southern Methodist, Ojeleye helped lead the Mustangs to their second ever AAC Tournament victory by recording averages of 18.9 points and 6.8 rebounds per game there. As a result of his efforts, he became the AAC Tournament's MVP that year, as well as be named to the All-AAC First Team, the AAC Player of The Year, and was an honorable mention via the Associated Press for the NCAA All-American Team. For the second of Boston's three second round picks, at number 53, the Celtics selected senior shooting guard Kadeem Allen from University of Arizona. In his senior year at Arizona, he averaged 9.8 points and 4 rebounds per game, which would be enough for him to be named a member of the Pac-12 Second Team and Pac-12 Defensive Team. Finally, with their last second round pick at number 56, Boston chose another senior shooting guard, this time being Jabari Bird from the University of California. During his last season at California, Bird averaged 14.3 points and 4.3 rebounds for the Golden Bears, but he suffered a concussion during one of his last games there. Both Kadeem Allen and Jabari Bird would become the team's first ever players to sign two-way contracts with the team, meaning they get to split their playing time for at least this season between the Celtics and their NBA G League affiliate, the Maine Red Claws, with Maine holding them for the majority of this season as a result of the two-way contract's stipulations.

Roster

Standings

Division

Conference

dwency

Game log

Preseason

|- style="background:#cfc"
| 1
| October 2
| Charlotte
| 
| Daniel Theis (12)
| Daniel Theis (7)
| Jayson Tatum (5)
| TD Garden18,624
| 1–0
|- style="background:#cfc"
| 2
| October 6
| @ Philadelphia
| 
| Kyrie Irving (21)
| Al Horford (9)
| Gordon Hayward (5)
| Wells Fargo Center17,668
| 2–0
|- style="background:#cfc"
| 3
| October 9
| Philadelphia
| 
| Semi Ojeleye (16)
| Terry Rozier (10)
| Terry Rozier (6)
| TD Garden18,624
| 3–0
|- style="background:#cfc"
| 4
| October 11
| @ Charlotte
| 
| Kyrie Irving (16)
| Al Horford (8)
| Kyrie Irving (10)
| Spectrum CenterN/A
| 4–0

Regular season

|- style="background:#fcc"
| 1
| October 17
| @ Cleveland
| 
| Jaylen Brown (25)
| Jayson Tatum (10)
| Kyrie Irving (10)
| Quicken Loans Arena20,562
| 0–1
|- style="background:#fcc"
| 2
| October 18
| Milwaukee
| 
| Jaylen Brown (18)
| Jayson Tatum (9)
| Terry Rozier (6)
| TD Garden18,624
| 0–2
|- style="background:#cfc"
| 3
| October 20
| @ Philadelphia
| 
| Kyrie Irving (21)
| Al Horford (9)
| Irving, Larkin (4)
| Wells Fargo Center20,816
| 1–2
|- style="background:#cfc"
| 4
| October 24
| New York
| 
| Jaylen Brown (23)
| Al Horford (13)
| Kyrie Irving (7)
| TD Garden18,624
| 2–2
|- style="background:#cfc"
| 5
| October 26
| @ Milwaukee
| 
| Al Horford (27)
| Al Horford (9)
| Kyrie Irving (7)
| UW–Milwaukee Panther Arena11,046
| 3–2
|- style="background:#cfc"
| 6
| October 28
| @ Miami
| 
| Kyrie Irving (24)
| Al Horford (9)
| Marcus Smart (4)
| American Airlines Arena19,600
| 4–2
|- style="background:#cfc"
| 7
| October 30
| San Antonio
| 
| Kyrie Irving (24)
| Al Horford (13)
| Kyrie Irving (6)
| TD Garden18,624
| 5–2

|- style="background:#cfc"
| 8
| November 1
| Sacramento
| 
| Brown, Irving (22)
| Daniel Theis (10)
| Marcus Smart (8)
| TD Garden18,624
| 6–2
|- style="background:#cfc"
| 9
| November 3
| @ Oklahoma City
| 
| Kyrie Irving (25)
| Jaylen Brown (12)
| Kyrie Irving (6)
| Chesapeake Energy Arena18,203
| 7–2
|- style="background:#cfc"
| 10
| November 5
| @ Orlando
| 
| Jaylen Brown (18)
| Al Horford (10)
| Marcus Smart (8)
| Amway Center17,731
| 8–2
|- style="background:#cfc"
| 11
| November 6
| @ Atlanta
| 
| Kyrie Irving (35)
| Al Horford (10)
| Al Horford (9)
| Philips Arena13,215
| 9–2
|- style="background:#cfc"
| 12
| November 8
| L.A. Lakers
| 
| Aron Baynes (21)
| Jaylen Brown (11)
| Marcus Smart (6)
| TD Garden18,624
| 10–2
|- style="background:#cfc"
| 13
| November 10
| Charlotte
| 
| Larkin, Tatum (16)
| Jaylen Brown (13)
| Marcus Smart (7)
| TD Garden18,624
| 11–2
|- style="background:#cfc"
| 14
| November 12
| Toronto
| 
| Al Horford (21)
| Aron Baynes (8)
| Marcus Smart (9)
| TD Garden18,624
| 12–2
|- style="background:#cfc"
| 15
| November 14
| @ Brooklyn
| 
| Kyrie Irving (25)
| Al Horford (11)
| Kyrie Irving (5)
| Barclays Center12,936
| 13–2
|- style="background:#cfc"
| 16
| November 16
| Golden State
| 
| Jaylen Brown (22)
| Al Horford (11)
| Kyrie Irving (6)
| TD Garden18,624
| 14–2
|- style="background:#cfc"
| 17
| November 18
| @ Atlanta
| 
| Kyrie Irving (30)
| Jayson Tatum (7)
| Al Horford (6)
| Philips Arena16,381
| 15–2
|- style="background:#cfc"
| 18
| November 20
| @ Dallas
| 
| Kyrie Irving (47)
| Brown, Morris, Tatum (9)
| Marcus Smart (8)
| American Airlines Center20,302
| 16–2
|- style="background:#fcc"
| 19
| November 22
| @ Miami
| 
| Kyrie Irving (23)
| Al Horford (9)
| Horford, Smart, Tatum (4)
| American Airlines Arena19,704
| 16–3
|- style="background:#cfc"
| 20
| November 24
| Orlando
| 
| Kyrie Irving (30)
| Aron Baynes (11)
| Al Horford (10)
| TD Garden18,624
| 17–3
|- style="background:#cfc"
| 21
| November 25
| @ Indiana
| 
| Kyrie Irving (25)
| Marcus Smart (6)
| Horford, Irving (6)
| Bankers Life Fieldhouse16,303
| 18–3
|- style="background:#fcc"
| 22
| November 27
| Detroit
| 
| Marcus Smart (23)
| Brown, Baynes (6)
| Kyrie Irving (9)
| TD Garden18,624
| 18–4
|- style="background:#cfc"
| 23
| November 30
| Philadelphia
| 
| Kyrie Irving (36)
| Horford, Theis (8)
| Marcus Smart (8)
| TD Garden18,624
| 19–4

|- style="background:#cfc"
| 24
| December 2
| Phoenix
| 
| Kyrie Irving (19)
| Marcus Morris (8)
| Al Horford (11)
| TD Garden18,624
| 20–4
|- style="background:#cfc"
| 25
| December 4
| Milwaukee
| 
| Kyrie Irving (32)
| Al Horford (9)
| Al Horford (8)
| TD Garden18,624
| 21–4
|- style="background:#cfc"
| 26
| December 6
| Dallas
| 
| Kyrie Irving (23)
| Jayson Tatum (10)
| Al Horford (8)
| TD Garden18,624
| 22–4
|- style="background:#fcc"
| 27
| December 8
| @ San Antonio
| 
| Kyrie Irving (36)
| Al Horford (9)
| Horford, Morris (5)
| AT&T Center18,418
| 22–5
|- style="background:#cfc"
| 28
| December 10
| @ Detroit
| 
| Al Horford (18)
| Aron Baynes (13)
| Al Horford (6)
| Little Caesars Arena18,776
| 23–5
|- style="background:#fcc"
| 29
| December 11
| @ Chicago
| 
| Al Horford (15)
| Jayson Tatum (10)
| Horford, Rozier (5)
| United Center19,617
| 23–6
|- style="background:#cfc"
| 30
| December 13
| Denver
| 
| Kyrie Irving (33)
| Aron Baynes (6)
| Marcus Smart (9)
| TD Garden18,624
| 24–6
|- style="background:#fcc"
| 31
| December 15
| Utah
| 
| Kyrie Irving (33)
| Brown, Horford (6)
| Al Horford (7)
| TD Garden18,624
| 24–7
|- style="background:#cfc"
| 32
| December 16
| @ Memphis
| 
| Kyrie Irving (20)
| Jayson Tatum (9)
| Horford, Irving (6)
| FedExForum17,794
| 25–7
|- style="background:#cfc"
| 33
| December 18
| @ Indiana
| 
| Kyrie Irving (30)
| Al Horford (10)
| Al Horford (9)
| Bankers Life Fieldhouse16,055
| 26–7
|- style="background:#fcc"
| 34
| December 20
| Miami
| 
| Kyrie Irving (33)
| Al Horford (8)
| Kyrie Irving (5)
| TD Garden18,624
| 26–8
|- style="background:#fcc"
| 35
| December 21
| @ New York
| 
| Kyrie Irving (32)
| Daniel Theis (7)
| Al Horford (5)
| Madison Square Garden19,812
| 26–9
|- style="background:#cfc"
| 36
| December 23
| Chicago
| 
| Kyrie Irving (25)
| Daniel Theis (15)
| Kyrie Irving (7)
| TD Garden18,624
| 27–9
|- style="background:#fcc"
| 37
| December 25
| Washington
| 
| Irving, Tatum (20)
| Jaylen Brown (9)
| Al Horford (6)
| TD Garden18,624
| 27–10
|- style="background:#cfc"
| 38
| December 27
| @ Charlotte
| 
| Kyrie Irving (21)
| Al Horford (11)
| Kyrie Irving (8)
| Spectrum Center19,611
| 28–10
|- style="background:#cfc"
| 39
| December 28
| Houston
| 
| Kyrie Irving (26)
| Al Horford (8)
| Marcus Smart (5)
| TD Garden18,624
| 29–10
|- style="background:#cfc"
| 40
| December 31
| Brooklyn
| 
| Kyrie Irving (28)
| Baynes, Horford (10)
| Al Horford (5)
| TD Garden18,624
| 30–10

|- style="background:#cfc"
| 41
| January 3
| Cleveland
| 
| Terry Rozier (20)
| Horford, Irving (9)
| Kyrie Irving (6)
| TD Garden18,624
| 31–10
|- style="background:#cfc"
| 42
| January 5
| Minnesota
| 
| Marcus Smart (18)
| Baynes, Theis (10)
| Horford, Irving (8)
| TD Garden18,624
| 32–10
|- style="background:#cfc"
| 43
| January 6
| @ Brooklyn
| 
| Kyrie Irving (21)
| Daniel Theis (10)
| Kyrie Irving (4)
| Barclays Center17,732
| 33–10
|- style="background:#cfc"
| 44
| January 11
| @ Philadelphia
| 
| Jaylen Brown (21)
| Horford, Morris (8)
| Horford, Irving (7)
| The O2 Arena19.078
| 34–10
|- style="background:#fcc"
| 45
| January 16
| New Orleans
| 
| Kyrie Irving (24)
| Al Horford (9)
| Al Horford (6)
| TD Garden18,624
| 34–11
|- style="background:#fcc"
| 46
| January 18
| Philadelphia
| 
| Horford, Morris (14)
| Marcus Morris (6)
| Jaylen Brown (4)
| TD Garden18,624
| 34–12
|- style="background:#fcc"
| 47
| January 21
| Orlando
| 
| Kyrie Irving (40)
| Jayson Tatum (10)
| Kyrie Irving (5)
| TD Garden18,624
| 34–13
|- style="background:#fcc"
| 48
| January 23
| @ L.A. Lakers
| 
| Kyrie Irving (33)
| Al Horford (12)
| Al Horford (6)
| Staples Center18,997
| 34–14
|- style="background:#cfc"
| 49
| January 24
| @ L.A. Clippers
| 
| Kyrie Irving (20)
| Brown, Irving, Theis (8)
| Kyrie Irving (7)
| Staples Center19,430
| 35–14
|- style="background:#fcc"
| 50
| January 27
| @ Golden State
| 
| Kyrie Irving (37)
| Al Horford (13)
| Kyrie Irving (4)
| Oracle Arena19,596
| 35–15
|- style="background:#cfc"
| 51
| January 29
| @ Denver
| 
| Kyrie Irving (27)
| Terry Rozier (9)
| Irving, Horford, Rozier (6)
| Pepsi Center19,520
| 36–15
|- style="background:#cfc"
| 52
| January 31
| New York
| 
| Marcus Morris (20)
| Terry Rozier (11)
| Terry Rozier (10)
| TD Garden18,624
| 37–15

|- style="background:#cfc"
| 53
| February 2
| Atlanta
| 
| Terry Rozier (31)
| Aron Baynes (8)
| Al Horford (7)
| TD Garden18,624
| 38–15
|- style="background:#cfc"
| 54
| February 4
| Portland
| 
| Al Horford (22)
| Al Horford (10)
| Horford, Tatum, Rozier (5)
| TD Garden18,624
| 39–15
|- style="background:#fcc"
| 55
| February 6
| @ Toronto
| 
| Terry Rozier (18)
| Aron Baynes (8)
| Terry Rozier (4)
| Air Canada Centre20,017
| 39–16
|- style="background:#cfc"
| 56
| February 8
| @ Washington
| 
| Kyrie Irving (28)
| Marcus Morris (8)
| Kyrie Irving (6)
| Capital One Arena20,356
| 40–16
|- style="background:#fcc"
| 57
| February 9
| Indiana
| 
| Kyrie Irving (21)
| Al Horford (8)
| Kyrie Irving (5)
| TD Garden18,624
| 40–17
|- style="background:#fcc"
| 58
| February 11
| Cleveland
| 
| Terry Rozier (21)
| Terry Rozier (9)
| Al Horford (6)
| TD Garden18,624
| 40–18
|- style="background:#fcc"
| 59
| February 14
| L.A. Clippers
| 
| Kyrie Irving (33)
| Marcus Morris (11)
| Kyrie Irving (8)
| TD Garden18,624
| 40–19
|- align="center"
| colspan="9" style="background:#bbcaff;" | All-Star Break
|- style="background:#cfc"
| 60
| February 23
| @ Detroit
| 
| Daniel Theis (19)
| Daniel Theis (7)
| Terry Rozier (7)
| Little Caesars Arena20,491
| 41–19
|- style="background:#cfc"
| 61
| February 24
| @ New York
| 
| Kyrie Irving (31)
| Al Horford (10)
| Kyrie Irving (8)
| Madison Square Garden19,812
| 42–19
|- style="background:#cfc"
| 62
| February 26
| Memphis
| 
| Kyrie Irving (25)
| Marcus Morris (8)
| Irving, Smart (5)
| TD Garden18,624
| 43–19
|- style="background:#cfc"
| 63
| February 28
| Charlotte
| 
| Kyrie Irving (34)
| Al Horford (10)
| Marcus Smart (6)
| TD Garden18,624
| 44–19

|- style="background:#fcc"
| 64
| March 3
| @ Houston
| 
| Marcus Morris (21)
| Monroe, Horford, Smart (6)
| Kyrie Irving (6)
| Toyota Center18,055
| 44–20
|- style="background:#cfc"
| 65
| March 5
| @ Chicago
| 
| Jaylen Brown (21)
| Greg Monroe (9)
| Terry Rozier (7)
| United Center21,286
| 45–20
|- style="background:#cfc"
| 66
| March 8
| @ Minnesota
| 
| Kyrie Irving (23)
| Al Horford (8)
| Kyrie Irving (8)
| Target Center18,978
| 46–20
|- style="background:#fcc"
| 67
| March 11
| Indiana
| 
| Marcus Smart (20)
| Marcus Smart (7)
| Marcus Smart (8)
| TD Garden18,624
| 46–21
|- style="background:#fcc"
| 68
| March 14
| Washington
| 
| Marcus Morris (31)
| Greg Monroe (10)
| Terry Rozier (9)
| TD Garden18,624
| 46–22
|- style="background:#cfc"
| 69
| March 16
| @ Orlando
| 
| Monroe, Rozier (17)
| Marcus Morris (11)
| Terry Rozier (5)
| Amway Center18,981
| 47–22
|- style="background:#fcc"
| 70
| March 18
| @ New Orleans
| 
| Jayson Tatum (23)
| Terry Rozier (7)
| Terry Rozier (5)
| Smoothie King Center18,277
| 47–23
|- style="background:#cfc"
| 71
| March 20
| Oklahoma City
| 
| Jayson Tatum (23)
| Jayson Tatum (11)
| Al Horford (7)
| TD Garden18,624
| 48–23
|- style="background:#cfc"
| 72
| March 23
| @ Portland
| 
| Marcus Morris (11)
| Greg Monroe (10)
| Shane Larkin (7)
| Moda Center19,575
| 49–23
|- style="background:#cfc"
| 73
| March 25
| @ Sacramento
| 
| Terry Rozier (33)
| Greg Monroe (8)
| Al Horford (8)
| Golden 1 Center17,583
| 50–23
|- style="background:#cfc"
| 74
| March 26
| @ Phoenix
| 
| Jayson Tatum (23)
| Al Horford (9)
| Al Horford (7)
| Talking Stick Resort Arena18,055
| 51–23
|- style="background:#cfc"
| 75
| March 28
| @ Utah
| 
| Jaylen Brown (21)
| Shane Larkin (9)
| Larkin, Monroe (4)
| Vivint Smart Home Arena18,306
| 52–23
|- style="background:#cfc"
| 76
| March 31
| Toronto
| 
| Marcus Morris (25)
| Marcus Morris (9)
| Terry Rozier (7)
| TD Garden18,624
| 53–23

|- style="background:#fcc"
| 77
| April 3
| @ Milwaukee
| 
| Jaylen Brown (22)
| Greg Monroe (10)
| Al Horford (5)
| Bradley Center16,188
| 53–24
|- style="background:#fcc"
| 78
| April 4
| @ Toronto
| 
| Marcus Morris (21)
| Terry Rozier (9)
| Monroe, Rozier, Tatum (3)
| Air Canada Centre19,963
| 53–25
|- style="background:#cfc"
| 79
| April 6
| Chicago
| 
| Jaylen Brown (32)
| Greg Monroe (11)
| Greg Monroe (10)
| TD Garden18,624
| 54–25
|- style="background:#fcc"
| 80
| April 8
| Atlanta
| 
| Jayson Tatum (19)
| Terry Rozier (8)
| Terry Rozier (9)
| TD Garden18,624
| 54–26
|- style="background:#fcc"
| 81
| April 10
| @ Washington
| 
| Jaylen Brown (27)
| Al Horford (13)
| Terry Rozier (5)
| Capital One Arena18,887
| 54–27
|- style="background:#cfc"
| 82
| April 11
| Brooklyn
| 
| Aron Baynes (26)
| Aron Baynes (14)
| Shane Larkin (7)
| TD Garden18,624
| 55–27

Playoffs

|- style="background:#cfc;"
| 1
| April 15
| Milwaukee
| 
| Al Horford (24)
| Al Horford (12)
| Horford, Tatum, Brown (4)
| TD Garden18,624
| 1–0
|- style="background:#cfc;"
| 2
| April 17
| Milwaukee
| 
| Jaylen Brown (30)
| Jayson Tatum (7)
| Terry Rozier (8)
| TD Garden18,624
| 2–0
|- style="background:#fcc;"
| 3
| April 20
| @ Milwaukee
| 
| Al Horford (16)
| Greg Monroe (11)
| Terry Rozier (9)
| Bradley Center18,717
| 2–1
|- style="background:#fcc;"
| 4
| April 22
| @ Milwaukee
| 
| Jaylen Brown (34)
| Aron Baynes (11)
| Terry Rozier (8)
| Bradley Center18,717
| 2–2
|- style="background:#cfc;"
| 5
| April 24
| Milwaukee
| 
| Al Horford (22)
| Al Horford (14)
| Terry Rozier (5)
| TD Garden18,624
| 3–2
|- style="background:#fcc;"
| 6
| April 26
| @ Milwaukee
| 
| Jayson Tatum (22)
| Al Horford (10)
| Terry Rozier (5)
| Bradley Center18,717
| 3–3
|- style="background:#cfc;"
| 7
| April 28
| Milwaukee
| 
| Terry Rozier (26)
| Al Horford (8)
| Terry Rozier (9)
| TD Garden18,624
| 4–3

|- style="background:#cfc;"
| 1
| April 30
| Philadelphia
| 
| Terry Rozier (29)
| Terry Rozier (8)
| Marcus Smart (9)
| TD Garden18,624
| 1–0
|- style="background:#cfc;"
| 2
| May 3
| Philadelphia
| 
| Jayson Tatum (21)
| Al Horford (12)
| Terry Rozier (9)
| TD Garden18,624
| 2–0
|- style="background:#cfc;"
| 3
| May 5
| @ Philadelphia
| 
| Jayson Tatum (24)
| Aron Baynes (10)
| Jayson Tatum (4)
| Wells Fargo Center20,758
| 3–0
|- style="background:#fcc;"
| 4
| May 7
| @ Philadelphia
| 
| Jayson Tatum (20)
| Al Horford (10)
| Jayson Tatum (4)
| Wells Fargo Center20,936
| 3–1
|- style="background:#cfc;"
| 5
| May 9
| Philadelphia
| 
| Jayson Tatum (25)
| Aron Baynes (9)
| Marcus Smart (6)
| TD Garden18,624
| 4–1

|- style="background:#cfc;"
| 1
| May 13
|Cleveland
| 
| Jaylen Brown (23)
| Marcus Morris (10)
| Terry Rozier (8)
| TD Garden18,624
| 1–0
|- style="background:#cfc;"
| 2
| May 15
| Cleveland
| 
| Jaylen Brown (23)
| Al Horford (10)
| Marcus Smart (9)
| TD Garden18,624
| 2–0
|- style="background:#fcc;"
| 3
| May 19
| @ Cleveland
| 
| Jayson Tatum (18)
| Al Horford (7)
| Marcus Smart (6)
| Quicken Loans Arena20,562
| 2–1
|- style="background:#fcc;"
| 4
| May 21
| @ Cleveland
| 
| Jaylen Brown (23)
| Al Horford (7)
| Terry Rozier (11)
| Quicken Loans Arena20,562
| 2–2
|- style="background:#cfc;"
| 5
| May 23
| Cleveland
| 
| Jayson Tatum (24)
| Al Horford (12)
| Terry Rozier (6)
| TD Garden18,624
| 3–2
|- style="background:#fcc;"
| 6
| May 25
| @ Cleveland
| 
| Terry Rozier (28)
| Al Horford (9)
| Marcus Smart (8)
| Quicken Loans Arena20,562
| 3–3
|- style="background:#fcc;"
| 7
| May 27
| Cleveland
| 
| Jayson Tatum (24)
| Marcus Morris (12)
| Marcus Smart (7)
| TD Garden18,624
| 3–4

Transactions

Trades

Free agency

Additions

Subtractions

Awards

References

Boston Celtics seasons
Boston Celtics
Boston Celtics
Boston Celtics
Celtics
Celtics